Elachista beothucella is a moth of the family Elachistidae. It is found in Canada, where it has been recorded from Nova Scotia.

References

beothucella
Moths described in 1996
Moths of North America